E14, E-14, E.14 or E 14 may refer to:

Military 
 , a United Kingdom Royal Navy submarine which saw service during World War I
 Yokosuka E14Y, an Imperial Japanese Navy seaplane which saw service during World War II
 E 14 (Norway), a section within the Norwegian Intelligence Service specializing on covert missions abroad

Transportation 
 European route E14, a road which runs through Norway and Sweden
 E14, a postcode district in the E postcode area
 LSWR E14 class, a locomotive operated by the London and South Western Railway in the United Kingdom
 Keiyō Road, Tateyama Expressway and Futtsu-Tateyama Road, route E14 in Japan
 Johor Bahru Eastern Dispersal Link Expressway, road in Malaysia

Other uses 
 Queen's Indian Defence, Encyclopaedia of Chess Openings code
 E14 screw, a type of Edison screw fitting for light bulbs
 E-14 The New MIT Media Lab